The 1995–96 Green Bay Phoenix men's basketball team represented the University of Wisconsin–Green Bay in the 1995–96 NCAA Division I men's basketball season. Their head coach was Mike Heideman. The Phoenix played their home games at the Resch Center and were members of the Horizon League. They finished the season 25–4, 16–0 in Horizon League play and lost in the first round of the 1996 NCAA tournament to Virginia Tech.

Roster

Schedule and results

|-
!colspan=9| Regular season

|-
!colspan=9| MCC tournament

|-
!colspan=9| NCAA tournament

Rankings

Awards and honors
Jeff Nordgaard – MCC Player of the Year
Mike Heideman – MCC Coach of the Year

References

Green Bay Phoenix men's basketball seasons
Green Bay Phoenix Men's
Green Bay Phoenix Men's
Green Bay Phoenix men's basket
Green Bay Phoenix men's basket